Oakvale Wildlife Park is a wildlife park established by the Sansom family in Salt Ash, in the Port Stephens region of New South Wales, Australia. Home to a variety of animals which, while primarily native species of eastern Australia, also includes some exotic species. It also has several children's play facilities, including a water-play area and tractor rides.

Animal exhibits

Aviaries (some walk-through)
Tawny frogmouth
Laughing kookaburra
Blue-winged kookaburra
Australian magpie
Bush stone-curlew
Galah
Sulphur-crested cockatoo
Red-tailed black cockatoo
Blue-and-gold macaw
Cockatiel
Eclectus parrot
Superb parrot
Alexandrine parrot
Sun conure
Purple-crowned lorikeet
Rainbow lorikeet
Diamond dove
Bar-shouldered dove
Pied imperial pigeon

'Reptile Ravine'
Perentie
Lace monitor
Sand goanna
Spencer's goanna
Frilled lizard
Eastern water dragon
Boyd's forest dragon
Central bearded dragon
Pygmy bearded dragon
Eastern blue-tongued lizard
Northern blue-tongued lizard
Shingleback lizard
Cunningham's spiny-tailed skink
Eastern Pilbara spiny-tailed skink
Scrub python
Olive python
Woma python
Black-headed python
Centralian carpet python
Darwin carpet python (albino)
Water python

Other reptiles
American alligator
Saltwater crocodile (juvenile)
Murray River turtle
Eastern long-necked turtle

'Wetlands Walk' and 'Waterfowl Pond'
 Royal spoonbill
 Black swan
 Canada goose
 Cape Barren goose
 Brown Chinese goose
 Australian wood duck
 Muscovy duck
 Pacific black duck
 Plumed whistling duck
 Wandering whistling duck
 Freckled duck
 Mallard duck
 Aylesbury duck
 Indian runner duck
 Grey teal duck
 Chestnut teal duck
 Radjah shelduck
 Eurasian coot
 Dusky moorhen

'Lemur Island' 
Ring-tailed lemur

'Wallaby Walk'
Red-necked wallaby 
Parma wallaby 
Swamp wallaby
Tammar wallaby 
Quokka

Adjacent exhibits
Dingo
Lumholtz's tree-kangaroo
Meerkat
Emu
Common ostrich

'Nocturnal House'
Eastern quoll
Southeastern common brushtail possum
Southeastern ringtail possum
Sugar glider

Adjacent exhibits ('Koala Country' etc.)
Koala
Bare-nosed wombat
Tasmanian devil
Short-beaked echidna
Southern cassowary
Wedge-tailed eagle
Barn owl

'Farmyard Nursery'
…is a walkthrough animal nursery which includes:
Domestic goat
Domestic sheep
Guinea pig
Domestic rabbit including Flemish giant rabbit
Chinese silky bantam
Helmeted guinea fowl

Paddocks
Donkey
Miniature pony
Domestic pig (including Berkshire pig)
Arabian camel
Llama
Alpaca
Water buffalo
Scottish highland cattle and Texas longhorn cattle
Jersey cow, Holstein-Freisian cow and Red Angus calves

Kangaroo area
Red kangaroo
Eastern grey kangaroo

References

External links

Wildlife parks in Australia
Zoos in New South Wales
Port Stephens Council